72nd Street is one of the major bi-directional crosstown streets in New York City's borough of Manhattan. The street primarily runs through the Upper West Side and Upper East Side neighborhoods. It is one of the few streets to go through Central Park via Women's Gate, Terrace Drive, and Inventors Gate, though Terrace Drive is often closed to vehicular traffic.

History

On October 11, 2006, the Belaire Apartments, a 50-story apartment complex located at 524 E. 72nd Street between York Avenue and the FDR Drive, was the site of a plane crash involving Cory Lidle's aircraft.

Landmarks

East Side
At Third Avenue, the Tower East apartment block (1960) set a new model for high-rise residences: a slab tower set back from the street front and isolated on a low base.

The architects McKim, Mead & White’s mansion for Charles L. Tiffany, built in 1882 at the northeast corner of Madison Avenue, was demolished in 1936 and replaced by an apartment block (19 East 72nd Street) designed by the architects Mott B. Schmidt and Rosario Candela.). The Rhinelander Mansion, on the southeast corner, is now occupied by Ralph Lauren.

The mansion that once stood at the southeast corner of Fifth Avenue was the first of the Gilded Age mansions to be replaced by an apartment block, 907 Fifth Avenue.

West Side
The Dakota apartment building is located on the northwest corner of West 72nd Street and Central Park West.

The Park & Tilford Building, on the southwest corner of West 72nd St and Columbus Avenue, built by the eponymous retailer, was designed by McKim Mead and White.  The New York Times observed that the opening in September 1893, "was attended by hundreds, who admired the building and the artistic display of goods."  The article added "There is no business building more handsome on the west side" and the New-York Tribune called it "a decided architectural ornament to the neighborhood."  The building was converted into residential apartments in 1972.

At 72nd Street, Broadway crosses Amsterdam Avenue, creating a small triangular space, Verdi Square; across the street to the south lies Sherman Square.

The Eleanor Roosevelt Monument at the southern tip of Riverside Park marks the intersection of 72nd Street and Riverside Drive. The Chatsworth Apartments (344 West 72nd Street), a designated landmark designed by the architect John E. Scharsmith, sits at 72nd Street's western end, where it curves into Riverside Boulevard.

Transportation
72nd Street has three New York City Subway stops along its length:
72nd Street at Broadway and Amsterdam Avenue served by the 
72nd Street at Central Park West served by the 
72nd Street at Second Avenue served by the 

The M72 provides crosstown bus service to Upper East Side – York Avenue (eastbound) or West Side – Freedom Place (westbound) via 72nd Street. The M72 bus crosses Central Park at 65th Street, because Terrace Drive within the park is often closed to vehicular traffic.

The New York Central Railroad's 72nd Street station previously existed on Park Avenue, which now carries the Park Avenue main line of the Metro-North Railroad. The station closed in approximately 1901, and an emergency exit is the only vestige of the station's existence.

Notable residents

Manny Acta, major league baseball manager, 524 East 72nd Street
Robert Agostinelli, self-made billionaire financier, 36 East 72nd Street
Allan Arbus, actor, 319 East 72nd Street
Arthur Ashe, tennis player, 360 East 72nd Street
Lauren Bacall, actress, 1 West 72nd Street
Ivan Boesky, stock trader, 524 East 72nd Street
Carol Higgins Clark, mystery author, 524 East 72nd Street
Thomas E. Dewey, two-time Governor of New York, 141 East 72nd Street
Marc Eidlitz, builder, 123 East 72nd Street
Joan Fontaine, British-American actress, 160 East 72nd Street
Alex Gard, cartoonist
George Gershwin, composer and pianist, 132 East 72nd Street 
Hugh J. Grant, mayor of New York City, 20 East 72nd Street
Margaux Hemingway, model and actress, 12 East 72nd Street
Louise Huff, actress, 155 East 72nd Street 
John Lennon, musician, songwriter, 1 West 72nd Street
Barbara Margolis, prisoners' rights advocate, 30 East 72nd Street
David Margolis, industrialist, 30 East 72nd Street
Louis Marshall, lawyer, 47 East 72nd Street
James Merrill, poet, author of "164 East 72nd Street"
Yoko Ono, artist, activist, 1 West 72nd Street
Dorothy Parker, writer, satirist, 214 West 72nd Street 
George Plimpton, writer, editor, New York City fireworks commissioner, 541 East 72nd Street
Lee Radziwill, actress and socialite, 160 East 72nd Street
Jason Robards, Jr., actor, 1 West 72nd Street
Marvin R. Shanken, publisher, 524 East 72nd Street
Winthrop H. Smith, investment banker
Harold Stanley, cofounder of Morgan Stanley, 4 East 72nd Street
John Steinbeck, writer, 190 and 206 East 72nd Street
James Stillman, businessman, 9 East 72nd Street
Aileen Osborn Webb, patron of crafts

Notes 

072
Upper West Side
Upper East Side